β-Propiolactone is an organic compound of the lactone family, with a four-membered ring. It is a colorless liquid with a slightly sweet odor, highly soluble in water and miscible with ethanol, acetone, diethyl ether and chloroform. The word propiolactone usually refers to this compound, although it may also refer to α-propiolactone.

Production
β-Propiolactone is prepared industrially by the reaction of formaldehyde and ethenone in the presence of aluminium- or zinc chloride as catalyst:

In the research laboratory, propiolactones have been produced by the carbonylation of epoxides.

Reactions and applications
It reacts with many nucleophiles in a ring-opening reactions.  With water hydrolysis occurs to produce 3-hydroxypropionic acid (hydracryclic acid).  Ammonia gives the β-alanine, which is a commercial process.

Propiolactone was once widely produced as an intermediate in the production of acrylic acid and its esters. That application has been largely displaced in favor of safer and less expensive alternatives. β-Propiolactone is an excellent sterilizing and sporicidal agent, but its carcinogenicity precludes that use.  It is used to inactivate a wide variety of viruses, for example as a step in vaccine production.  The principal use of propiolactone is an intermediate in the synthesis of other chemical compounds.

Safety
β-Propiolactone is "reasonably anticipated to be a human carcinogen" (IARC, 1999). It is one of 13 "OSHA-regulated carcinogens," chemicals regarded occupational carcinogens by the Occupational Safety and Health Administration, despite not having an established permissible exposure limit.

Biodegradation

Acidovorax sp., Variovorax paradoxus, Sphingomonas paucimobilis, Rhizopus delemar and thermophilic Streptomyces sp. can degrade β-propiolactone.

See also
 3-Oxetanone, an isomer of β-propiolactone
 Malonic anhydride (2,4-oxetanone)
 α-Propiolactone

References

Beta-lactones
Sweet-smelling chemicals